Birmingham International is a railway station located in Solihull in the West Midlands, to the east of the city of Birmingham, England.

The station is on the Rugby–Birmingham–Stafford Line 14 km (8½ miles) east of Birmingham New Street and serves Birmingham Airport, National Exhibition Centre (incorporating the Resorts World Arena) and Resorts World Birmingham.

History
The station was designed by the architect Ray Moorcroft and opened on 26 January 1976;  it has regular train services to many parts of the country. It was named Birmingham International after the adjacent airport which was, at the time, named Birmingham International Airport, but has since been rebranded as Birmingham Airport.  The large space under the overbridge to the left of the southbound platforms suggests space was allowed for future expansion of the station.

In 2016, it was proposed to rename it to Birmingham Airport & NEC, due to the airport's name change and the near presence of the National Exhibition Centre.

Services
The station is managed by Avanti West Coast and is also served by CrossCountry, Transport for Wales and West Midlands Trains. It has five platforms, consisting of two islands and one side platform numbered 1-5 from south to north.

The basic off-peak service is as follows:

Avanti West Coast
1 train per hour continues to Blackpool North/ (alternating each hour) via   and 
2 trains per day continue to  via  and 

During the rush hour, certain Avanti West Coast services to/from  start and terminate here.

CrossCountry

Transport for Wales

West Midlands Trains
2 trains call at  only, under the London Northwestern Railway brand

Connection to Birmingham Airport

A maglev service ran from the airport terminal to the station from 1984 until 1995. The train "flew" at an altitude of 15 mm over a track 620 m in length. It operated for nearly 11 years, but was scrapped because spare parts for the system were no longer available. It was temporarily replaced by a bus.

The chosen replacement system, the Doppelmayr Cable Car Cable Liner Shuttle, was announced in late 2000 and construction started in 2001. The Interchange was opened in March 2003. The system was originally known as SkyRail but in 2004 it was renamed AirRail Link.

The airport can also be reached via a dedicated fast bus service from Coleshill Parkway station, on the Birmingham to Peterborough Line.

Connection to the National Exhibition Centre
Undercover walkways, escalators and travelators connect the NEC buildings to the station and to the Air-Rail Link which, in turn, connects to Birmingham Airport.

Birmingham interchange

A new Birmingham Interchange is to be built on the other side of the M42 motorway from the station to link it with the proposed High Speed 2 rail line. The new interchange would be connected to the station by an automated people mover, as well as to the airport and National Exhibition centre; the AirRail Link people mover already operates between Birmingham International station and the airport.

References

External links

Rail Around Birmingham and the West Midlands: Birmingham International station

Railway stations in Solihull
DfT Category B stations
Airport railway stations in the United Kingdom
Railway stations opened by British Rail
Railway stations in Great Britain opened in 1976
Railway stations served by CrossCountry
Railway stations served by Transport for Wales Rail
Railway stations served by Avanti West Coast
Railway stations served by West Midlands Trains
1976 establishments in England
Stations on the West Coast Main Line